This is the List of municipalities in Konya Province, Turkey .

Municipalities and mayors 
List is sorted alphabetically A-Z, as Districts->Municipalities.

Changes in 2014
According to Law act no. 6360, belde (town) municipalities within provinces with more than 750,000 population (so called Metropolitan municipalities) were abolished as of 30 March 2014. 168 belde municipalities in the above list are now defunct. The list is kept for historical reference.

References 

Geography of Konya Province
Konya